KOPW (106.9 FM, "Power 106.9") is an Omaha, Nebraska-based rhythmic contemporary radio station. It is owned and operated by NRG Media.  Licensed to Plattsmouth, Nebraska, its studios are located at Dodge Street and 50th Avenue in Midtown Omaha, and its transmitter site is located southeast of Council Bluffs, Iowa.

History

Adult standards (1992-1999) 
The station was originally KOTD-FM and had an adult standards format from 1992 until November 1999.

Adult alternative/alternative (1999-2004)
In 1999, the station was sold to Waitt Media (later NRG Media), who in turn, flipped the station to adult album alternative as KCTY ("106-9 The City"). By September 2000, KCTY shifted to a more mainstream alternative rock format in the hopes of boosting ratings.

'80s hits (2004-2005) 
On March 12, 2004, at 3 p.m., after stunting with a 24-hour robotic countdown accompanied by "On the Run" by Pink Floyd, it flipped to All-80s Hits as "Retro 106.9".

Adult hits (2005-2006) 
Just 14 months later, on May 26, 2005, at Noon, the station flipped to adult hits as "106-9 Bob FM." The first song on "Bob FM" was "Get This Party Started" by P!nk.

Rhythmic (2006-present) 
On December 31, 2002, their sister station, KBLR-FM, which aired adult contemporary music, began to target the market with an Urban Contemporary format as "Hot 107.7 & 97.3." The station, which was unique in that it was the first station in the state of Nebraska playing Hip Hop and R&B music full-time, was signal-challenged from the start, since the 97.3 signal (licensed to Blair, Nebraska) barely covered the metro and the 107.7 frequency was a translator. Despite the signal deficiencies, the format created the highest ratings and revenue in the history of those signals, and was home of the Russ Parr Morning Show during its tenure.

On December 29, 2006, at 3 p.m., NRG turned KCTY into the all-new KOPW ("Power 106.9"). The Rhythmic Contemporary-formatted KOPW is a modified version of the format of "Hot 107.7 & 97.3." Based from KBLR playing Hip Hop/R&B, the Urban format tilted over to Rhythmic is "in fashion" with the frequency move.

With KOPW going Rhythmic, it now puts them in direct competition with Top 40 Mainstream competitors KQCH (who, incidentally, started out as a Rhythmic when they debuted in May 1999), and since 2012, KISO. At first, KOPW was reported to R&R as an urban contemporary station, but has since evolved to a broader Rhythmic direction, and in October 2009, was added to both Mediabase and Nielsen BDS' Rhythmic panels.

From October 2007 until April 5, 2019, KOPW served as the Omaha affiliate for the syndicated Big Boy’s Neighborhood program that aired in mornings, until NRG decided not to renew its contract with Premiere Networks. On April 8, 2019, the station became 100% local in all day parts with the debut of “Chef West & The Morning Scramble” hosted by Tay ‘Mr. West’ Westberry (who is also a professional chef, hence the nickname) and former American Idol season 13 contestant (and YouTube blogger) Alyssa Siebken. The morning show would last nearly a year; Westberry and Siebken would be moved to afternoons, with mornings going jockless for a time. On February 24, 2021, NRG announced that KOPW would pick up the syndicated The Breakfast Club for mornings beginning March 1.

As of April 2022, KOPW is ranked 6th in the market according to the March 2022 Nielsen Audio Ratings report for the Omaha market.

See also
 Houston Alexander

References

External links
Power 106.9's website

OPW
Rhythmic contemporary radio stations in the United States
Radio stations established in 1992
NRG Media radio stations